Henri Begleiter (September 11, 1935 in Nimes, France – April 6, 2006 in Long Island, NY) was a neurophysiologist and Distinguished Professor of Psychiatry
and Neuroscience at SUNY Downstate Medical Center in Brooklyn. He was a leader in the nascent field of biomedical alcohol research in the
1970s, postulating alcoholism as a brain disorder. He founded and headed the world-renowned Neurodynamics Laboratory at SUNY Downstate Medical
Center, Brooklyn, which has been renamed in 2007 into the 'Henri Begleiter Neurodynamics Laboratory'.

The highlights of Begleiter’s career include the ground breaking finding published in Science that some neurophysiological anomalies in alcoholics were
already present in their young offspring before any exposure to alcohol and drugs. These seminal findings led Henri to propose a model that changed
the thinking in the field: namely, that rather than being a consequence of alcoholism, this underlying neural hyperexcitability was a predisposing
factor leading to the development of alcoholism and related disorders. This innovative study was replicated throughout the world and launched him on
a systematic search to elucidate the genetic vulnerability underlying a predisposition toward alcoholism and related disorders.

In 1990, with his foresight and charismatic leadership, Henri Begleiter was instrumental in assembling scientists in various domains to organize the
large Collaborative Studies on Genetics of Alcoholism — COGA, which he has led since its inception. Under his leadership, with a strong
emphasis on novel approaches such as using brain oscillations as endophenotypes, COGA has successfully identified several genes involved in the
predisposition to develop alcoholism and related disorders, and this approach is still state-of-the-art today.

Books 
 The Biology of Alcoholism, edited by Kissin and Begleiter, Volumes 1-7. 1971-1983
 Alcohol and Alcoholism, edited by Begleiter and Kissin, Volumes 1-2. 1995-1996
 Evoked Brain Potentials and Behavior (The Downstate Series of Research in Psychiatry and Psychology, Volume 2), edited by Begleiter, 1979.
 Biological Effects of Alcohol, 1980.

References

External links 

 Henri Begleiter biography at SUNY Downstate

1935 births
2006 deaths
American neuroscientists
Neurophysiologists